Evening is the period of a day that starts at the end of the afternoon and overlaps with the beginning of night. The exact times when evening begins and ends depend on location, time of year, and culture, but it is generally regarded as beginning when the Sun is low in the sky and lasting until the end of twilight. Depending on the speaker, it may start as early as 5 p.m. and to last until night. It may be used colloquially to include the last waning afternoon shortly before sunset.

Etymology
The word is derived from the Old English ǣfnung, meaning 'the coming of evening, sunset, time around sunset', which originated from æfnian, meaning "become evening, grow toward evening". The Old English æfnian originated from æfen (eve), which meant "the time between sunset and darkness", and was synonymous with even (Old English æfen), which meant the end of the day. The use of "evening" dates from the mid 15th century.

See also 
 Crepuscular – animals that are active primarily in the early morning and the evening
 Dusk
 Evening dress (disambiguation)
 Sunset
 Eve of a feast

References

External links 
 
 

 
Parts of a day